Fernando Gasparini Carandina (born 30 April 1990), commonly known as Nando Carandina, is a Brazilian professional footballer who plays as a defensive midfielder for Santo André.

Career statistics

References

External links

1990 births
Living people
Brazilian footballers
Association football midfielders
Campeonato Brasileiro Série B players
Campeonato Brasileiro Série C players
Campeonato Brasileiro Série D players
Clube Atlético Taquaritinga players
Desportivo Brasil players
Sertãozinho Futebol Clube players
Grêmio Barueri Futebol players
Mogi Mirim Esporte Clube players
Rio Claro Futebol Clube players
Oeste Futebol Clube players
Associação Desportiva São Caetano players
Red Bull Brasil players
Paysandu Sport Club players
São Bernardo Futebol Clube players
Grêmio Novorizontino players